The 2021 season was the San Jose Earthquakes' 39th year of existence, their 23rd season in Major League Soccer and their 13th consecutive season in the top-flight of American soccer.

Players

Squad information

Transfers

In

Draft picks 

Draft picks are not automatically signed to the team roster. Only those who are signed to a contract will be listed as transfers in.

Transfers out

Loans Out

Competitions

Friendlies

Major League Soccer

Standings

Overall

Western Conference

Regular season

U.S. Open Cup

Qualifying

References

San Jose Earthquakes seasons
San Jose Earthquakes
San Jose Earthquakes
San Jose Earthquakes